Santosh Raosaheb Danve (born 15 December 1986) is an Indian politician from Jalna district of Maharashtra. He was the youngest member of the 13th Maharashtra Legislative Assembly and belongs to the Bhartiya Janata Party.

Early life
Danve is the son of Raosaheb Danve, Minister of State, independent in-charge of Consumer Affairs, Food and Public Distribution. He graduated from the Moreshwar Arts, Science and Commerce College, Bhokardan.

Career

Positions 

 BJP Member in Maharashtra Legislative Assembly

Personal life 
Danve married Renu Sarkate, the daughter of Marathi musician Rajesh Sarkate, in March 2017.

References

Bharatiya Janata Party politicians from Maharashtra
Living people
1986 births
Maharashtra MLAs 2014–2019
People from Marathwada
Marathi politicians
People from Jalna, Maharashtra